Eskandarabad may refer to:
 Eskandarabad, Khuzestan
 Eskandarabad, North Khorasan
 Eskandarabad, Razavi Khorasan
 Eskandarabad, Semnan
 Eskandarabad, West Azerbaijan